The Nightmare Factory is a 2007 comics anthology from Fox Atomic Comics adapting individual short stories by Thomas Ligotti.  The second book in the series, The Nightmare Factory – Volume 2, was published in September 2008. It features new short essays by Ligotti.

Contents
 "The Last Feast of Harlequin" (Stuart Moore & Colleen Doran)
 "Dream of a Mannikin" (Stuart Moore & Ben Templesmith)
 "Dr. Locrian's Asylum"' (Joe Harris & Ted McKeever)
 "Teatro Grottesco" (Joe Harris & Michael Gaydos)

External links

Fox Atomic Comics
The Nightmare Factory – Animated Book Trailer
Eric Lieb talks "The Nightmare Factory", Comic Book Resources, September 7, 2007

2007 books
2007 comics debuts
American graphic novels
Comics based on fiction
Horror comics